Balsamiq Studios is an ISV founded in March 2008 by Peldi Guilizzoni, a former Adobe senior software engineer.  The Web-based Balsamiq mockup tool was launched in June 2008. Balsamiq has 33 employees based in San Francisco, Sacramento, Chicago, Bologna, Paris, and Bremen. In 2011, Balsamiq achieved almost US$5 million in sales, and US$6.4 million in 2015.

Products

Balsamiq Wireframes

Balsamiq Wireframes is a graphical user interface website wireframe builder application. It allows the designer to arrange pre-built widgets using a drag-and-drop WYSIWYG editor. The application is offered in a desktop version as well as a plug-in for Google Drive, Confluence and JIRA.

Versions for FogBugz and XWiki were offered until November 1, 2013.

See also 
 Mockup
 Prototyping
 Rapid application development
 Rapid prototyping
 Software Prototyping
 User interface design
 Website wireframe

References

External links
 Balsamiq

Software companies based in California
Software companies of Italy
Software companies of the United States
2008 establishments in the United States
Software companies established in 2008